Jacinto is an unincorporated community in Kimball County, Nebraska, United States.

History
Jacinto was a station on the Union Pacific Railroad.

Jacinto is derived from a Spanish name meaning "hyacinth".

References

Unincorporated communities in Kimball County, Nebraska
Unincorporated communities in Nebraska